Amui (also Romanized as ‘Amū’ī) is a village in Bakesh-e Yek Rural District, in the Central District of Mamasani County, Fars Province, Iran. At the 2006 census, its population was 222, in 46 families.

References 

Populated places in Mamasani County